Yamagata Prefectural General Sports Park Gymnasium is an arena in Tendo, Yamagata, Japan. It is the part of Benibana Sports Park and the home arena of the Passlab Yamagata Wyverns of the B.League, Japan's professional basketball league.

References

External links
Yamagata Prefectural General Sports Park

Basketball venues in Japan
Indoor arenas in Japan
Passlab Yamagata Wyverns
Sports venues in Yamagata Prefecture
Tendō, Yamagata
Sports venues completed in 1992
1992 establishments in Japan